Get ready for Brexit was a campaign launched by the British government on 2 September 2019. It encouraged the public to prepare for the UK leaving the European Union (EU) on 31 October. It ran across television, social media, billboards and other platforms and was the largest government public information campaign in British history.

Development 
The Times reported on 30 August 2019 that a taxpayer-funded advertising campaign was under development which would cost up to £100 million. An advertising industry source said that the figure was "substantially higher" than the amount spent on traditional advertising in the UK by brands such as Amazon, Tesco and Asda in 2018. An order was placed for branded merchandise and there were claims that the government considered using the Vote Leave slogan 'take back control'.

The campaign was developed by Engine Group who were appointed following Boris Johnson's election in the 2019 Conservative Party leadership contest. Manning Gottlieb OMD were hired to handle the campaign's media buying.

Launch 

The Get ready for Brexit campaign went live on 2 September 2019, stating that the UK would be leaving the EU on 31 October and urging the public to visit a new website, gov.uk/brexit, to see what they needed to do to prepare for it. In announcing the campaign's arrival, Chancellor of the Duchy of Lancaster Michael Gove said that "Ensuring an orderly Brexit is not only a matter of national importance, but a shared responsibility." The Get ready for Brexit slogan appeared for the first time on an advertising screen next to a John Lewis store at the Westfield shopping centre in Stratford, East London. An image showing one of the campaign's billboards was issued by the Cabinet Office in the week beginning 2 September 2019.

Reception 
#GetReadyForBrexit was the fourth highest UK Twitter trend on the morning of 2 September 2019.

Pro-Brexit campaigners drew comparison with the leaflets delivered to every house in the UK during the 2016 referendum by David Cameron's government in support of remaining in the EU.

Further into September, a cross-party group of MPs led by Liberal Democrat leader Jo Swinson wrote to Sir Mark Sedwill, the head of the Civil Service, condemning the Get ready for Brexit campaign as "redundant and misleading". They urged Sedwill to intervene to "make clear the UK is highly unlikely to leave without a deal" on 31 October 2019, saying: "A publicly funded campaign, encouraging businesses to be ready for the UK’s October no-deal exit, as well as being factually incorrect (as it addressed an event which could not occur) is inherently party political (as it cannot be government policy, but is Conservative policy), bringing the campaign into conflict." As the campaign did not acknowledge the Benn Act, which rules out leaving the EU without a deal, it was described by opposition MPs as an election campaign rather than a campaign for public information.

The pro-Remain group Led by Donkeys held a public competition to redesign the government posters, satirising the Brexit situation.

Conclusion 
The advertising campaign continued throughout September and October 2019 even as it appeared increasing unlikely the 31 October deadline would be met. Around a week before the end of October it was reported the government had ended the campaign though this turned out to be untrue. The campaign was paused on 28 October, three days before the UK was supposed to leave, after Boris Johnson accepted the EU's offer to extend the withdrawal process until 31 January 2020.

In January 2020, the National Audit Office reported that the government had spent £46 million on the Get Ready for Brexit campaign in October 2019. The auditors concluded that "it is not clear that the campaign resulted in the public being significantly better prepared".

References

External links 

 Official website

Brexit
British advertising slogans
British political phrases
2019 in British politics
Advertising campaigns
Political posters of the United Kingdom
2019 in the United Kingdom
2019 introductions